The River Looe (meaning deep water inlet) is a river in south-east Cornwall, which flows into the English Channel at Looe. It has two main branches, the East Looe River and the West Looe River. The western branch has its source near Dobwalls.

South of Liskeard, the Looe Valley Line railway follows the course of the East Looe River to Looe. The railway is so close to the river that flooding is a common occurrence.

The lowest stretch of the rivers combine to form the tidal harbour and estuary of Looe.

The river is tidal to Watergate on the West Looe and Sandplace on the East Looe. After Sandplace, the river was connected to the Liskeard and Looe Union Canal so that minerals and stone could be transported from the workings and quarries above Liskeard to the harbour at Looe.  The tidal estuarine section is an example of a Ria (a drowned river valley) and at low tide, the rivers almost dry up to a very small natural level.

See also

Rivers of the United Kingdom

References

Rivers of Cornwall